Gorg Aliabad (also Romanized as Gorg ‘Alīābād; also known as Gorg ‘Alī-ye Nowrūz) is a village in Mirbag-e Shomali Rural District, in the Central District of Delfan County, Lorestan Province, Iran. At the 2006 census, its population was 78, in 15 families.

References 

Towns and villages in Delfan County